This page details the match results and statistics of the South Africa national soccer team from 1992 to 1999.

Results

References

1992-1999
1990s in South Africa